Save The Bay is a nonprofit organization dedicated to preserving San Francisco Bay and its related estuarine habitat areas. Founded by Catherine Kerr, Sylvia McLaughlin, and Esther Gulick in 1961, the organization grew into a body that not only achieved its namesake but also inspired analogous organizations dedicated to other environmental and other political causes. The organization continues to fight to protect the bay from development and landfill and to oppose redevelopment of salt flats; it instead encourages their restoration to a natural state.

History
The organization helped to spark the environmental movement in the United States. The women were successful in saving the bay. They lobbied the state government until state legislation in 1965 established the San Francisco Bay Conservation and Development Commission as a state agency.

In 1961, Sylvia McLaughlin and 2 other women Kay Kerr, Esther Gulick, worked together and decided to send 1,000 letters asking for $1 membership. In just a few days, the 900 responses came in and it was $900.

The organization still works to protect the wildlife of the Bay Area and water quality of the uniquely large inland body of water. When it was founded it was the first successful regional grassroots campaign to achieve that sort of goal. Save The Bay prevented the destruction of San Bruno Mountain to fill 27 miles (44 km) of the San Mateo County shoreline. The founders' main goal was to preserve the natural beauty of the bay. Their efforts have also been noted as the first successful conservation efforts in an urban area.

The women's efforts led to the creation of the Bay Conservation and Development Commission, which was later used as the blueprint and inspiration for other government commissions such as the Tahoe Regional Planning Agency, California Coastal Commission, and Delta Stewardship Council.

Plastic bag bans
The organization has also embraced and pushed for plastic bag bans throughout the entire region. It includes strong support for strengthening the San Francisco plastic bag ban in 2011 that banned all retailers from giving out bags made of non-biodegradable materials. Save The Bay supported the 2012 San Jose, California, ban on plastic bags.

See also 

Reber Plan

References

Further reading

External links
Save The Bay
USGS factsheet on the Bay
"Saving San Francisco Bay", essay
A history of the organization's efforts

Environmental organizations based in the San Francisco Bay Area
Organizations based in Oakland, California
Organizations established in 1961
San Francisco Bay